The Andersen thermostat is a proposal in molecular dynamics simulation for maintaining constant temperature conditions. It is based on the reassignment of a chosen atom or molecule's velocity. The new velocity is given by Maxwell–Boltzmann statistics for the given temperature.

References

External links
 Sklogwiki description

Molecular dynamics